Afipia carboxidovorans is a Gram-negative soil bacterium. It is aerobic, the cells are rod-shaped.

References

External links
 Oligotropha LPSN List of Prokaryotic names with Standing in Nomenclature
Type strain of Oligotropha carboxidovorans at BacDive -  the Bacterial Diversity Metadatabase

Nitrobacteraceae
Bacteria described in 1994